The High Commissioner Attack was an incident which saw the beginning of the Aden Emergency. Arab nationalists of the NLF made a grenade attack against the British High Commissioner, Sir Kennedy Trevaskis, killing one person and injuring 50.

George Henderson, the assistant high commissioner, saved Sir Kennedy's life by pushing him out of the way. Henderson later died of his injuries.

The incident led to Britain declaring a state of emergency in the colony.

References

External links
Aden Emergency at the Argylls Website
Aden Emergency at National Army Museum

Conflicts in 1963
Aden Emergency
Failed assassination attempts in Asia
Deaths by hand grenade
December 1963 events in Asia
1963 in the Federation of South Arabia